Anfani FM is a privately operated radio network in Niger. Based in the capital of Niamey, Anfani also has stations in the regional centers of Maradi, Zinder, Birni Nkonni, and Diffa.

History and content
Founded by newspaper journalist Grémah Boucar as an offshoot of his Anfani print news weekly, Radio Anfani (FM 100 MHz) in Niamey was one of Niger's first non-governmental broadcasters.  Anfani was shut several times in the 1990s by the government of Col. Ibrahim Baré Maïnassara. Since the return of civilian rule in 1999, Anfani FM journalists have faced arrest and government sanctions related to their reporting on a number of  occasions.

Anfani provided access to the airways for opposition politicians during the military regime, and continues to broadcast domestic news in French, Hausa, Djerma, and other regional languages.  The station also rebroadcasts the  Voice of America and Deutsche Welle news.  While private, Anfani has previously received grants from the United States government, through the National Endowment for Democracy.

Stations
Anfani broadcasts with transmitters of 1.5 kW based in Niamey, Maradi, Birni Nkonni, Zinder and Diffa, all on FM 100MHZ.

See also
 Media of Niger

References

 Anfani FM - 100MHZ, AfDevInfo .
GRÉMAH BOUCAR: Free Media Heroes, International Press Institute, 3 May 2000.
ANFANI FM, National Endowment for Democracy.
 Journal Anfani, June 1999 Internet Issue.

Radio in Niger
Mass media in Niamey